The 2019 Men's South American Volleyball Championship was the 33rd edition of the Men's South American Volleyball Championship, organised by South America's governing volleyball body, the Confederación Sudamericana de Voleibol (CSV). The tournament was held in Mostazal, Santiago and Temuco, Chile from 10 to 14 September 2019. The top four teams which had not yet qualified to the 2020 Summer Olympics qualified for the 2020 South American Olympic Qualification Tournament.

Pools composition

Squads

Venues
 Gimnasio Olímpico Regional UFRO, Temuco, Chile – Pool A and 5th–8th places
 Centro Nacional de Entrenamiento Olímpico, Santiago, Chile – Pool B and Semifinals
 Gran Arena Monticello, Mostazal, Chile – 3rd place match and Final

Pool standing procedure
 Number of matches won
 Match points
 Sets ratio
 Points ratio
 If the tie continues as per the point ratio between two teams, the priority will be given to the team which won the last match between them. When the tie in points ratio is between three or more teams, a new classification of these teams in the terms of points 1, 2 and 3 will be made taking into consideration only the matches in which they were opposed to each other.

Match won 3–0 or 3–1: 3 match points for the winner, 0 match points for the loser
Match won 3–2: 2 match points for the winner, 1 match point for the loser

Preliminary round
All times are Chile Summer Time (UTC−03:00).

Pool A

|}

|}

Pool B

|}

|}

Final round
All times are Chile Summer Time (UTC−03:00).

5th–8th places

5th–8th semifinals

|}

7th place match

|}

5th place match

|}

Final four

Semifinals

|}

3rd place match

|}

Final

|}

Final standing

Awards

Most Valuable Player
 Alan Souza
Best Setter
 Matías Sánchez
Best Outside Spikers
 Yoandy Leal
 Dusan Bonacić

Best Middle Blockers
 Flávio Gualberto
 Gabriel Araya
Best Opposite Spiker
 Bruno Lima
Best Libero
 Santiago Danani

See also

South American Women's Volleyball Championship
Men's U23 South American Volleyball Championship
Men's Junior South American Volleyball Championship
Boys' Youth South American Volleyball Championship
Boys' U17 South American Volleyball Championship
Volleyball at the Pan American Games
Men's Pan-American Volleyball Cup
Women's Pan-American Volleyball Cup

References

External links
Official website

Men's South American Volleyball Championships
South American Volleyball Championship
2019 in Chilean sport
Sport in Santiago
Temuco
International volleyball competitions hosted by Chile
2019 in South American sport
Men's South American Volleyball Championship